Miloushka Yasemin Smit (born 21 November 1984 in Amsterdam) is a water polo player of the Netherlands who represented the Dutch national team in international competitions.

Smit was part of the team that became 10th at the 2005 World Aquatics Championships in Montreal. At the 2006 FINA Women's Water Polo World League in Cosenza and the 2006 Women's European Water Polo Championship in Belgrade they finished in fifth place, followed by the 9th spot at the 2007 World Aquatics Championships in Melbourne. The Dutch team finished in fifth place at the 2008 Women's European Water Polo Championship in Málaga. In Kirishi they qualified for the 2008 Summer Olympics in Beijing. There they ended up winning the gold medal on 21 August, beating the United States 9-8 in the final.

She has played for the Greek giants Olympiacos, winning the Greek Championship in 2009. In 2017, she plays again for this team.

She was the captain of the Dutch team winning the 2008 Summer Olympics, the silver medal at the 2015 World Aquatics Championships, 2014 European Championship and 2016 European Championship and de bronze medal at the 2010 European Championship.

See also
 Netherlands women's Olympic water polo team records and statistics
 List of Olympic champions in women's water polo
 List of Olympic medalists in water polo (women)
 List of World Aquatics Championships medalists in water polo

References

External links
 

1984 births
Living people
Water polo players from Amsterdam
Dutch female water polo players
Water polo centre backs
Water polo players at the 2008 Summer Olympics
Medalists at the 2008 Summer Olympics
Olympic gold medalists for the Netherlands in water polo
World Aquatics Championships medalists in water polo
Olympiacos Women's Water Polo Team players
Dutch expatriate sportspeople in Greece
Expatriate water polo players